Kakeru is a Japanese given name. Notable people with the name include:

 , Japanese baseball player
 , Japanese footballer
 , Japanese footballer
 , Japanese novelist
 , Japanese footballer
 , Japanese baseball player
 , Japanese professional wrestler
 , Japanese footballer
 , Japanese artistic gymnast
 , Japanese baseball player

Japanese unisex given names